Bog of Beasts is a 2006 Brazilian drama film directed by Claudio Assis. The film won five awards at the 39th Brasilia Film Festival, including Best Picture.

Cast 
Mariah Teixeira .... Auxiliadora
Fernando Teixeira .... Seu Heitor
Caio Blat .... Cícero
Matheus Nachtergaele .... Everardo
Dira Paes .... Bela
Marcélia Cartaxo .... Ceiça
Hermila Guedes .... Dora
Conceição Camarotti .... Dona Margarida
João Ferreira .... Mestre Mário
Irandhir Santos .... Maninho
China .... Cilinho
Samuel Vieira .... Esdras

Awards 
2006: Festival de Brasília
Best Film 
Best Actress (Mariah Teixeira) (won)
Best Supporting Actor (Irandhir Santos) (won)
Best Supporting Actress (Dira Paes) (won)
Best Music (Pupillo) (won)
Best Supporting Actor (Melhor Ator Coadjuvante)
Critics Award	(won)

2007: Mar del Plata International Film Festival
Best Latin-American Film (Nominee)

2007: Rotterdam International Film Festival
Tiger Award (won)

2008: São Paulo Association of Art Critics Awards
Best Cinematography (Walter Carvalho) (won)

2008: Cinema Brazil Grand Prize
Best Picture (won)
Best Actor (Matheus Nachtergaele) (won) 
Best Actress (Dira Paes) (won) 
Best Supporting Actress (Marcelia Cartaxo) (won)  
Best Supporting Actress (Hermila Guedes) (won) 
Best Editing - Fiction (Karen Harley) (won)

References

External links 
 

2006 films
2006 drama films
2000s Portuguese-language films
Brazilian drama films